Rehan Jahangir Poncha (born 3 August 1986) is an Indian former swimmer, Olympian, Arjuna Award winner and a six-time national champion, who specialized in backstroke, butterfly, and individual medley events. He is also the recipient of the Eklavya Award from the Karnataka Olympic Association. He is a 6-time Indian swimming champion, and a 6-time record holder in the butterfly (both 100 and 200 m). Poncha also set two of his records in the freestyle and medley relays at the 2009 Asian Swimming Championships in Foshan, China, along with his teammates Sandeep Sejwal, Virdhawal Khade, and Aaron D'Souza.

Poncha qualified for the men's 200 m butterfly at the 2008 Summer Olympics in Beijing, by clearing a FINA B-standard entry time of 2:01.40 from the Telstra Grand Prix in Sydney, Australia. He edged out Peru's Emmanuel Crescimbeni to take a second spot in heat 1 by 0.24 of a second in 2:01.89. Poncha failed to advance into the semifinals, as he placed fortieth overall in the preliminaries. He has agreed to be a mentor for Indian Collegiate Athletic Program to support the future athletes and guide them to excel in swimming. He started his own academy known as swim smart with Rehan Poncha

Rehan completed his education in Jain University located in Bangalore.

References

External links
NBC 2008 Olympics profile

1986 births
Living people
Indian male swimmers
Indian male freestyle swimmers
Indian male backstroke swimmers
Indian male butterfly swimmers
Indian male medley swimmers
Olympic swimmers of India
Swimmers at the 2008 Summer Olympics
Swimmers at the 2002 Asian Games
Swimmers at the 2006 Asian Games
Swimmers at the 2010 Asian Games
Asian Games competitors for India
Commonwealth Games competitors for India
Swimmers at the 2006 Commonwealth Games
Swimmers at the 2010 Commonwealth Games
Swimmers from Karnataka
Recipients of the Arjuna Award
South Asian Games medalists in swimming
South Asian Games gold medalists for India
South Asian Games silver medalists for India